John "Jack" Miller is a novelist originally from Newberry, Michigan.

Career

Military career
Miller retired from the Air Force as a Senior Master Sergeant. He was awarded the US Army and Air Force Good Conduct Medal and several Air Force Commendation Medal and Air Force Meritorious Service Awards. He served as an Air Force Office of Special Investigations special agent.

Law enforcement career
After leaving the Air Force, Miller began his second career with the Clark County District Attorney's Office as a special investigator, working with undercover teams from the local Police and the FBI conducting burglary stings. He then joined the Nevada Gaming Control Board as an enforcement agent.

He was also certified as an expert witness in state and federal courts for gambling cheat trials.

Writing career
As of 2009, John Miller has written seven books.

 Cold War Warrior
 All Crooks Welcome
 Master Cheat!
 Cold War Defector
 Operation Switch
  The Peacekeepers
 The Black Cat
 Sin City Indictment
In addition he has written several short stories and four screenplays, one for a movie and three for TV (one hour).

References

External links
 Official website
 John Miller on LAMOO Books
 18 Questions - John "Jack" Miller
 John Miller on Author's Den

21st-century American novelists
American male novelists
Living people
American people in gambling regulation
Writers from Nevada
Novelists from Michigan
United States Air Force Office of Special Investigations
People from Newberry, Michigan
21st-century American male writers
Year of birth missing (living people)